Sarda may refer to :

Places and jurisdictions 
 Sarda (Albanian Sardë), a ruined ancient town, on Shurdhah Island in northern Albania.
 The former Diocese of Sarda, now a Latin Catholic titular see
 Sarda river, a river which forms part of the border between India and Nepal

People 
 Andrés Sardá Sacristán (1929–2019), a Spanish fashion designer
 Felix Sardà y Salvany (1844–1916), a Spanish Catholic priest
 Har Bilas Sarda (1867–1955), an Indian academic, judge and politician
 Javier Sardà (born 1958), a Spanish journalist and TV presenter of Crónicas marcianas
 Rosa Maria Sardà (1941-2020), a Spanish actress and comedian

Fiction 
 Sarda the Sage, a character from the NES Final Fantasy, appearing in the webcomic 8-Bit Theater
 a Vulcan in the Dreadnought! Star Trek: The Original Series novel

Things pertaining and names referring to Sardinia 
 Sarda (cattle), a breed of small cattle
 Sarda (goat), a goat breed
 Sarda (fish), the bonitos, a fish genus
 Sarda (pig), a breed of domestic pig
 Sarda (sheep), a breed of domestic sheep
 Testudo marginata sarda, the Sardinian marginated tortoise, a reptile subspecies
 Classica Sarda Olbia-Pantogia, a road bicycle race held in Sardinia
 L'Unione Sarda, an Italian local daily newspaper, based in Cagliari, Italy
 Vendetta... sarda, a 1951 comedy film directed by Mario Mattoli

Other 
 Sarda Act, the colonial Child Marriage Restraint Act, enacted in British India in 1929
 Andrés Sardá, a Catalan Spanish lingerie brand
 , a 1945 United States Navy Tench-class submarine
 a famous Marwari Maheshwari industrial house in Shekhawati, a semi-arid historical region located in the northeast part of Rajasthan, India